Ambrosiodmus asperatus, commonly known as ambrosia beetle, is a species of weevil found in China, India, Nepal, Indonesia: Java, Sumatra, Japan: Ryukyu Islands, Malaysia, Sri Lanka, Taiwan, and Brunei. The species also introduced to Australia.

Description
This very small species has a body length is about 2.5 to 2.8 mm. The species is characterized by having declivital interstriae 2 bearing a row of 3 to 5 denticles. The declivital interstriae 1 are distinctly impressed.

Biology
It is a polyphagous beetle found abundantly during the rainy season. In southern Thailand, in inhabited in durian-based agricultural lands and nearby forests.

References

External links
 Images of ambrosia beetle

Curculionidae
Insects of Sri Lanka
Insects described in 1895